The Vâna Mare is a right tributary of the river Lanca Birda in Romania. It flows into the Lanca Birda near Jebel.

References

Rivers of Timiș County
Rivers of Romania